Tafton-Wrightsville is an area in Pulaski County, Arkansas, United States.

It is in the Little Rock-North Little Rock Metropolitan area, southeast of Little Rock. It combines Tafton and Wrightsville to make Tafton-Wrightsville. It has almost 2,000 people as of 2006. It is one of the many growing areas in Arkansas. It is partly incorporated and partly Unincorporated. It is about 2.3 Sq. miles. About 24% Whites and 75% is blacks. It serves a radio station.

Populated places in Pulaski County, Arkansas